Canyon Valley School, alternatively known as Canyon Valley High School and often abbreviated as CV, CVS or CVHS is an alternative education institution in Mesa, Arizona serving primarily high school aged students, with some eighth grade classes also being offered. The school is operated by Gilbert Public Schools and presently hosts no official athletic or extracurricular activities.

Notable students
Teddy Allen - American basketball player

See also

Gilbert Public Schools
Education in Arizona

References

High schools in Mesa, Arizona
Public high schools in Arizona
Alternative schools in the United States
2010 establishments in Arizona
Educational institutions established in 2010